Around the Block may refer to:
 Around the Block (film), a 2013 Australian film
 "Around the Block", a song by Alien Ant Farm from their 2006 album Up in the Attic
 "Around the Block", a song by Parachute Express